Eslamabad (also Romanized as Eslāmābād; also known as Mīkhāneh) is a village in Javaran Rural District, Hanza District, Rabor County, Kerman Province, Iran. At the 2006 census, its population was 186, in 39 families.

References 

Populated places in Rabor County